Nevada County  is a county located in the southwestern part of the U.S. state of Arkansas. As of the 2020 census, the population was 8,310, less than half of its peak in 1920. The county seat is Prescott.  Nevada County is Arkansas's 63rd county, formed during the Reconstruction era on March 20, 1871, from portions of Hempstead, Ouachita and Columbia counties. It was named after the state of Nevada because of the perceived similarity between their physical shapes; the Arkansas county's shape, inverted, roughly follows the same outline as the state's boundary. It is an alcohol prohibition or dry county.

Dorcheat Bayou, a 122-mile stream, begins in Nevada County. It flows south into Columbia County and across the border into Webster Parish, Louisiana, where it flows into Lake Bistineau and ultimately Loggy Bayou, forming a continuous passage to the Red River. In the 19th century, the bayou was navigable for three to six months by steamboat from Bistineau to Minden. The watershed had fertile farmland, timberland and swampland. The bayou is now popular for fishing and its natural environment.

History
This area was historically occupied by members of the Caddoan Confederacy, whose territory extended into present-day Texas and Louisiana. They settled along the waterways, using them for transportation and fishing. Colonial French and later European-American settlers also took over lands along the waterways, which formed their basic transportation routes well into the 19th century. After the Congress repealed Prohibition in the early 20th century, Nevada County voted to retain it and the county is still "dry."

Geography
The county is bounded on the north by the Little Missouri River, a branch of the Ouachita River, and drained by several tributaries of that stream and of Red River. Nevada County is alternately considered as part of the greater regions of South Arkansas or Southwest Arkansas.

Major highways

 Interstate 30
 U.S. Highway 67
 U.S. Highway 278
 U.S. Highway 371
 Highway 19
 Highway 24
 Highway 32
 Highway 51
 Highway 53

Adjacent counties
Clark County (northeast)
Ouachita County (east)
Columbia County (south)
Lafayette County (southwest)
Hempstead County (west)
Pike County (northwest)

Demographics
The population declined by more than half from 1920 to 1970, due to mechanization of agriculture and the decline of the lumber industry causing loss of jobs. In addition, blacks left in the Great Migration to midwestern and western industrial cities, where they found better work and less social oppression.

2020 census

As of the 2020 United States census, there were 8,310 people, 3,397 households, and 2,263 families residing in the county.

2000 census
As of the 2000 United States Census, there were 9,955 people, 3,893 households, and 2,721 families residing in the county.  The population density was 16 people per square mile (6/km2).  There were 4,751 housing units at an average density of 8 per square mile (3/km2).  The racial makeup of the county was 66.90% White, 31.18% Black or African American, 0.38% Native American, 0.06% Asian, 0.85% from other races, and 0.62% from two or more races.  1.52% of the population were Hispanic or Latino of any race.

There were 3,893 households, out of which 31.40% had children under the age of 18 living with them, 51.90% were married couples living together, 14.00% had a female householder with no husband present, and 30.10% were non-families. 27.80% of all households were made up of individuals, and 13.70% had someone living alone who was 65 years of age or older.  The average household size was 2.48 and the average family size was 3.02.

In the county, the population was spread out, with 25.20% under the age of 18, 8.70% from 18 to 24, 26.10% from 25 to 44, 23.80% from 45 to 64, and 16.10% who were 65 years of age or older.  The median age was 38 years. For every 100 females, there were 94.40 males.  For every 100 females age 18 and over, there were 89.90 males.

The median income for a household in the county was $26,962, and the median income for a family was $33,095. Males had a median income of $27,888 versus $17,920 for females. The per capita income for the county was $14,184.  About 18.30% of families and 22.80% of the population were below the poverty line, including 28.00% of those under age 18 and 27.10% of those age 65 or over.

Government
Prior to 2000, Nevada County was considered an "ancestral" Democratic-voting county, with exceptions for the 1968 George Wallace campaign and the 1972 and 1984 landslides of Richard Nixon and Ronald Reagan, respectively.

Communities

Cities
Emmet
Prescott (county seat)

Towns
Bluff City
Bodcaw
Cale
Rosston
Willisville
Falcon

Census-designated place
Reader

Townships

 Alabama
 Albany
 Boughton
 Caney (Cale, Rosston)
 Emmet (Emmet)
 Georgia
 Jackson
 Leake
 Missouri (Prescott)
 Parker (Bodcaw)
 Redland
 Taylor (Willisville)
 Union (Bluff City, Reader)

See also
 Camp Bragg (Arkansas)
 List of lakes in Nevada County, Arkansas
 National Register of Historic Places listings in Nevada County, Arkansas

References

 
Hope micropolitan area
1871 establishments in Arkansas
Populated places established in 1871